Michele Marini (born 31 March 1961) is an Italian politician.

He is member of the Democratic Party and served as mayor of Frosinone from 29 May 2007 to 23 May 2012.

See also
 List of mayors of Frosinone

References 

1961 births
Living people
People from Frosinone
Democratic Party (Italy) politicians
20th-century Italian politicians
21st-century Italian politicians
Mayors of Frosinone